The 2nd Cinemalaya Independent Film Festival was held from July 17 until 23, 2006 in Metro Manila, Philippines.

Entries 
The following films are entries to the New Breed: Full-Length Feature section of Cinemalaya. The winning film is highlighted with boldface and a dagger.

Full-Length Features

Short films

Awards 
Full-Length Features
Best Film: Tulad ng Dati by Mike Sandejas
Special Jury Prize: Batad: Sa Paang Palay by Benji Garcia and Vic Acedillo, Jr.
Best Direction: Ron Bryant for Rotonda
Best Performance of an Actor: Alchris Galura for Batad: Sa Paang Palay
Best Performance of an Actress: Angel Aquino for Donsol
Best Screenplay: Vic Acedillo, Jr. for Batad: Sa Paang Palay
Best Cinematography: Eli Balce for Donsol
Best Sound Design: Ronald de Asis for Tulad ng Dati
Best Editing:
Mikael Angelo Pestaño for Tulad ng Dati
Hernani Hona, Jr. for Rotonda
Best Original Music Score: Lirio Salvador for Rotonda
Best Production Design: Aped Santos and Noel "Lola" Navarro for Batad: Sa Paang Palay

Short Films
Best Film: Orasyon by Rommel Tolentino
Special Jury Prize: Kwarto by Jose Maria Emmanuel C. Taylo
Best Direction: Jeck Cogama for Putot
Best Screenplay: Hubert Tibi for Parang Pelikula

Jury 
Selected for the Jury were:
Mark Escaler
Roger Garcia
Chito S. Roño
Kidlat Tahimik
Steve Vesagas

References

External links 

Cinemalaya Independent Film Festival
Cine
Cine
2006 in Philippine cinema